Brian Francis (born September 28, 1957) is a Mi'kmaq leader, Chief of the Abegweit First Nation from 2007 to 2018. On 11 October 2018 he was appointed to the Senate of Canada representing Prince Edward Island. He is the first Mi'kmaq from Prince Edward Island appointed to the Senate.

Prior to becoming chief, he was an Aboriginal programs co-ordinator with the Department of Fisheries and Oceans.

References

Living people
Indigenous Canadian senators
Canadian senators from Prince Edward Island
Independent Canadian senators
Indigenous leaders in Atlantic Canada
1957 births
Mi'kmaq people